Adutha Varisu is a 1983 Indian Tamil-language action drama film directed by S. P. Muthuraman, starring Rajinikanth and Sridevi. It is a remake of the 1972 Hindi film Raja Jani, which itself was loosely based on the 1956 American film Anastasia. The film was released on 7 July 1983.

Plot 

Kannan, a small-time bounty hunter, is enlisted by the crooked members of a royal zameen to find a girl to impersonate the lost heiress to the throne, so that they can usurp the Zameen's wealth. Kannan comes across a nomadic girl Valli and trains her to act appropriately, and introduces her as the lost heiress to the Zameen's head, Rani Amma Rajalakshmi, who is the grandmother of the lost heiress. However, when he learns from Valli's adopted parents that Valli is truly the lost heiress, he sets out to protect her and Rani Amma from the crooked clan.

Cast

Production 
Adutha Varisu is a remake of the 1972 Hindi film Raja Jani, which itself was loosely based on the 1956 American film Anastasia (1956). The film was produced by Dwarakish.

Soundtrack 
The soundtrack was composed by Ilaiyaraaja. The disco song "Aasai Nooru Vagai" was remixed by Yuvan Shankar Raja for Kurumbu (2003). The song "Dan Dana Dan" from the Hindi film Department (2012) too was adapted from "Aasai Nooru Vagai".

Release and reception 
Adutha Varisu was released on 7 July 1983. Kalki criticised the film for lack of originality.

References

Bibliography

External links 
 

1980s action drama films
1980s Tamil-language films
1983 films
Films based on adaptations
Films directed by S. P. Muthuraman
Films scored by Ilaiyaraaja
Films with screenplays by Panchu Arunachalam
Indian action drama films
Tamil remakes of Hindi films